Markus Herz (Berlin, 17 January 1747 – Berlin, 19 January 1803) was a German Jewish physician and lecturer on philosophy.

Biography 

Born in Berlin to very poor parents, Herz was destined for a mercantile career, and in 1762 went to Königsberg, East Prussia. He soon gave up his position as clerk and attended the University of Königsberg, becoming a pupil of Immanuel Kant, but was obliged to discontinue his studies for want of means. He thereupon became secretary to the wealthy Russian Ephraim, travelling with him through the Baltic Provinces.

On 21 August 1770, he travelled from Berlin and acted as respondent when Kant presented his Inaugural dissertation at the University of Königsberg for the post of ordinary professor. In 1770 he had returned to Germany and studied medicine in Halle, where he became a Doctor of Medicine in 1774, in which year he established himself in Berlin, being appointed physician at the Jewish hospital. Beginning in 1777, he delivered public lectures on medicine and philosophy, which were well attended by the students and the principal personages of the Prussian capital. At some of them even members of the royal family were present.

Herz married Henriette de Lemos in 1779 and their house was for a long time the meeting place of Berlin's political, artistic, and literary celebrities. In 1782 he became ill through overstudy, and had to give up his lectures until 1785, when a sojourn in Bad Pyrmont restored his health.

In 1791, he received the title of Professor of Philosophy at the academy and that of "Hofrath", but lectured only for a few years, giving most of his time to his medical practice. Herz was a friend and pupil of Moses Mendelssohn, and was also well acquainted with Lessing. For many years, Herz corresponded with Kant and their letters are considered to be of great philosophical importance. He died in Berlin.

Views 
Compulsory vaccination was strongly condemned by Herz, and in 1801 he wrote an open letter on the subject to Dr. D. Dohmeyer, under the heading "Ueber die Brutalimpfung".

Works 
Herz was the author of:
 Betrachtungen aus der Spekulativen Weltweisheit, Königsberg, 1771;
 Freimüthige Kaffeegespräche Zweier Jüdischer Zuschauerinnen über den Juden Pinkus, Berlin, 1772, a satirical essay;
 Versuch über die Ursachen der Verschiedenheit des Geschmacks (or Versuch über den Geschmack), Mitau, 1776;
 Briefe an Aerzte, Berlin, 1777–84;
 Grundriss der Medizinischen Wissenschaften, ib. 1782;
 Versuch über den Schwindel, ib. 1786, 2d ed. 1791, an important study;
 Grundlage zu den Vorlesungen über die Experimental-Physik, ib. 1787;
 Ein Sendschreiben an die Redaktion der Meassefim über das zu Frühe Beerdigen der Todten bei den Juden, ib. 1789.

Sources 
 R.J. Wunderbar, in Der Orient, Leipzig, 30 June 1849, pp. 408 et seq
 Ludwig Geiger, in Allg. Deutsche Biographie, 1880, xii. 261 et seq.;
 Oesterreichische Wochenschrift, 23 January 1903, pg. 59

References

1747 births
1803 deaths
18th-century German Jews
18th-century German philosophers
Jewish philosophers
People from the Margraviate of Brandenburg
Writers from Berlin
University of Königsberg alumni
University of Halle alumni
German male writers
19th-century German philosophers